Dabbadi is a village in Rowthulapudi Mandal, Kakinada district in the state of Andhra Pradesh in India.

Geography 

Demographics 
 India census, Dabbadi had a population of 183, out of which 94 were male and 89 were female. Population of children below 6 years of age were 27. The literacy rate of the village is 23.08%.

References 

Villages in Rowthulapudi mandal